Mycosphaerella linicola is a fungal plant pathogen.

Caused by the organism, its transmission, geographical distribution, and hosts. HOSTS: On leaves, stems and peduncles of Linum usitatissimum, and Linum spp. DISEASE: Pasmo disease of flax GEOGRAPHICAL DISTRIBUTION: Widespread with host (CMI Map 18, ed. 5, 1977). TRANSMISSION: The fungus carries over on crop debris and other Linum spp. It is said to remain viable in soil for several years (60, 2047). Infested seeds on germination produce infected seedlings (5, 365; 25, 449). In New Zealand seed-borne infection was said to be a minor factor and wind-borne infection

See also
 List of Mycosphaerella species

References

linicola
Fungal plant pathogens and diseases
Fungi described in 1910